Karapet Yeghiazaryan (March 7, 1932 in Yerevan – 2006 in Yerevan) was an Armenian painter, Honored Artist of Armenia, 1983.

Biography
Karapet Yeghiazaryuan was born in 1932 in Yerevan. The artistic depth of his nature was revealed in his childhood in his love towards nature, his perception of the beauty of its views and colors. He attended the painting group of the Ghoukassian Haouse of Pioneers (teacher Gagik Ghazaryan).

1953 graduated from Panos Terlemezyan Art College
1959 graduated from Leningrad Artistic Industrial High School after Mukhina
1972–1987 headed the section of decorative and applied arts of the RA Painter's Association
1973–1987 was a member of the Presidium and the Presidency of the RA Painter's Association
1962–1979  delivered lectures on design, painting and composition in the Terlemezyan Artistic College, for which in 1972 he was awarded an Honor Diploma of the Ministry of High and Secondary Special Education of the Armenian SSR, National Committee of Science and High School Education Workers
1964–1974 delivered lectures in the Yerevan Artistic and Theatrical Institute

Karapet Yeghiazaryan's works are exhibited in art galleries, museum, well-known cultural centers and private collections of Yerevan, Gyumri, Echmiadzin, Moscow, London, New York City, Kerch, Volgodonsk and in many cities of Russian Federation, the city of Timirtau in Kazakhstan, as well as other countries.

His daughter Anush Yeghiazaryan is the outstanding participant of the present stage of development of the Armenian tapestry.

Career 
The personal style of Yeghiazaryan was formed progressively; his mastership grew year after year; skills shaping his own language in his works grew more perfect. The first attempts made by Yeghiazaryan were to introduce partial modifications in traditional oriental carpets. In these series of his work the most interesting is the tapestry Praying for Peace (1967), in which the author managed to put into natural connection human static figures with ornaments filling the entire surface of the work.  The master organically transferred stylistic principles of the weaving art devices into the language of mosaics and obtained most interesting decorative effects, this time in the material of ‘stone carpet’.
Yeghiazaryan created works with logical structure which allows  to read with precision the author's thought and to create a unique ornamental structural system. Along with strict compositional order, one feels in Yeghiazaryan's works the material, the wool, its softness, tenderness, density, its amazing capacity of absorbing light to entirely render the deepness and strength of color.

Yeghiazaryan's frame of themes are : native Armenia, national traditions, events of social life and images of nature. Each new work was a further step leading to the solutions of image, contents and artistic problems.

Works 
Karapet Yeghiazaryan is the author of numerous mosaic panels 
Synthetics, 1967
Paradise, 1968, for which he was awarded by a Diploma of the Presidium of the Supreme Soviet of Armenian SSR, and which is now decorating the Memorial complex of the Sardarapat battle.
Grapes, 1969, now in the city of Artashat
The Sprout and the Sun, 1970, with co-authors M. Kamalyan and Ts. Azizyan, this huge composition is on the façade of the Institute of Biochemistry of the Armenian National Academy of Sciences.
Khachatur  Abovyan, 1972, in the city of Abovyan, done from small multicolor pieces of natural stones. In this mosaic the painter managed to realize his innovation, beautifully joining the color to the texture of stone and metal, attempting to reach necessary artistic integrity.
Science, 1972
Peace, 1975
Victory Review, 1975
Blossom, Our Lord, 1977, 140 m2, Usk-Kamenogorsk metallurgists’ Palace of Culture. This is a three-part composition, the three main panels of which are done in the relief texture technique, while parts between them and the tapestry borders are done in flat technique. The relief technique of Yeghiazaryan has also a functional role. The themes of the three main panels are: in the left side- Center of Metallurgy, in the center-Science and Labor, in the right side-People are Cheerful, devoted to the development of arts and people talents.
History of Communication, 1977, performed on the façade and the end wall of the Yerevan Branch of the Soviet Project Institute of Communication (now Armentel). Above the main entrance of the building the mosaic triptych has a total surface of 400 m2. It is narrating the history of communication,  science and astronautics. The mosaic is done from Armenian multicolor stones.
Soldier's Weeding, 1978
Glory Firework (180 m2), 1978, curtain-tapestry for the city of Kerch
Stage of Great Way (180 m2), 1980, curtain-tapestry for the city of Komsomolsk
Electricity in the Mountains, 1982
I am the Eye and You Are the Light, 1982
To the Health, 1982
Yard Tournament, 1982
Abundance, 1983
Song About Armenia, 1984
Victorious Return, 1985
Ode of Life, 1987
Curtain Art (180 m2), 1989, for the city of Volgodonsk
Sacrificem 1992
Three Graces, 1996
Armenian Pilgrims, 1997
Towards Light, 2003
Requiem monumental panel, 2005, 9 m2, dedicated to the 1700th  anniversary of the Adoption of Christianity in Armenia, done in a different style developing rather ideas of constructive design, than those of artistic textile; it was awarded by a special prize of the Armenian Church and an Honor Diploma of the Painter's Association of the RA

Exhibitions 
Karapet Yeghioazaryan participated in numerous exhibitions, international symposiums and biennales, had his personal exhibitions in Armenia and abroad.

Quotes about Karapet Yeghiazaryan 
“… in the mosaic made by Karapet Yeghiazaryan one can distinctly see carpet ornaments. Subsequently, the painter was guided by some fundamental compositional principles of weaving art, which influenced his works made with other materials, too.”

Professor Nikita Voronov

Art critic, PH.D., “Armenian Tapestry”, SovetakanArvest (Soviet Art), N 11, 1978, Yerevan (in Russian)

“Merited painter Karapet Yeghiazaryan is a multilaterally talented creator. His famous curtain Renaissance (1986) is decorating the scene of the Yerevan Sport and Concert Complex. I am the author of its composition, but the collaboration with Karapet Yeghiazaryna was indispensable to transform it into a curtain. Our common creative work created a piece of art of 360m 2, having 30 meters width and 12 meter height, which will decorate the wall of one of our architectural masterpieces”.

Grigor Khanjyan

Member of the USSR Academy of Fine arts, People's Artist, “A Curtain Representing Art”. Sovetakan Hayastan (Soviet Armenia), July 1986, Yerevan (in Armenian)

See also
List of Armenian artists
List of Armenians
Culture of Armenia

References

External links

 Karapet Yeghiazaryan, Bohem

1932 births
2006 deaths
Burials in Armenia
20th-century Armenian painters